BGU or Berliner griechische Urkunden (commenced in 1895) is an ongoing publishing program of Greek documents, primarily Greek papyri by the Berlin State Museums, primarily from the papyrus collection of the Egyptian Museum of Berlin. The project was originally entitled Ägyptische Urkunden aus den Königlichen Museen zu Berlin; Griechische Urkunden (Royal Museums) but then changed the title to Staatlichen Museen when the Museums' status changed. The term "papyrologist" itself was coined in connection with the establishment of the BGU project. The founding editors were Emil Seckel and Wilhelm Schubart.

References

Greek-language papyri
Ancient Greek works